Danmono is a traditional Japanese style of instrumental music for the koto. The few pieces of its repertoire were mostly composed and developed in the seventeenth century, and all follow a strict form of composition.

Musical style
Each danmono piece consists of a number of movements, or variations ("dan" in Japanese means "step"). Each dan consists of 104 beats, except for the first. The first dan is preceded by a four or eight-beat introduction, called kandō. The few pieces that make up the danmono repertoire are all very similar in musical style. Listeners unfamiliar with the danmono style have trouble distinguishing one piece from another. The reason for the strong similarities between the danmono pieces is that originality was unusual for seventeenth- and eighteenth-century Japanese composers. Each danmono piece begins slowly, and gradually increases in tempo. At the very end of the piece the tempo decreases, and it ends slowly.

Repertoire
The danmono repertoire consists of eight pieces, developed primarily during the seventeenth century. The titles of the pieces denote the number of dan they consist of: "" ("five dan"),   "" ("six dan"), "" ("seven dan"), "" ("eight dan"), "" ("nine dan"), and "" ("nine dan in hon-kumoijoshi"). "" is also referred to as "" ("ten dan") in the Ikuta ryu school, or "" ("twelve dan") in the Yamada ryu school. The introduction of "Aki kaze no kyoku" by Mitsuzaki Kengyo was composed in the danmono form, and is also considered to be part of its repertoire. Aside from this last piece, the authorship of the danmono repertoire is disputed among historical sources. The table below shows the possible composers according to various sources.
Source abbreviations
ST:  (1779)
BGT:  (1812)
KK:  (1822)
KZ:  (1941)

The publication was aimed at the general population rather than professional musicians.

References
Notes

Bibliography

Japanese styles of music